Americans Abroad!!! Against Me!!! Live in London!!! is Against Me!'s first live album, released on Fat Wreck Chords even though the band was signed to Sire Records at the time. It was recorded on March 21, 2006 at the Mean Fiddler venue in London, England. The band played songs stretching as far back as their 2001 The Acoustic EP, all the way to their 2005 album Searching for a Former Clarity. The album also features the previously unreleased track, Americans Abroad, which would go on to be recorded for their 2007 album New Wave. The disc also features a music video for the song 'Problems' as a multi-media track. It is Against Me!'s final release on Fat Wreck Chords before their major label debut on Sire Records.

Laura Jane Grace isn't a fan of this release, stating in 2015 "To be honest, to get into it with the old live record, it always bummed me out, You put that record on and the first song on it, 'The Energizer,' it's so drag-ass slow. It made me so sad every time I heard it. Warren, who played drums with us then, had real tempo issues, and Atom, is a better drummer. I'm not judging them morally as people, just saying musicianship-wise..."

Track listing

Personnel
Band
Laura Jane Grace – guitar, lead vocals
James Bowman – guitar, backing vocals
Andrew Seward – bass guitar, backing vocals 
Warren Oakes – drums

Production
Will Shapland – recording engineer
J. Robbins – assistant engineer, mixing
Chris Goddard – assistant engineer
Joe Clark – assistant engineer
Alan Douches – mastering
Jason Munn – design
Pat Graham – photography

References

Against Me! albums
2006 live albums
Fat Wreck Chords live albums